Artur Tiganik (born 13 January 1971) is an Estonian Brigadier General who served as the Deputy Commander of the Estonian Defence Forces. He previously served as the Commander of the Estonian Land Forces.

Biography
Tiganik was born in Loksa, Estonia. After graduating from the Basic Officers' course in Ryazan Higher Airborne Command School, he returned to Estonia and commanded units from platoon level up to battalion of the Kalev Infantry Battalion since 1992 to 2000. After graduating from Baltic Defence College, he continued his career as Commander of the Scouts Battalion from 2001 to 2004. In 2005, he was appointed to the ISAF mission in Afghanistan as a CJ3 Staff Officer. Between 2005 and 2006, Tiganik was Chief of the Training Department in the Estonian National Defence College. From 2006 to 2009 he served as Brigade Commander of the 1st Infantry Brigade.

From 2009 to 2012, Tiganik served as the Chief of Staff of the Estonian Land Forces and in 2012 he was promoted to the position of Commander. On 1 August 2014, Artur Tiganik was appointed Deputy Chief of the Estonian Defence Forces.

Awards and decorations

Effective dates of promotion

Personal life
In addition to Estonian, Tiganik is fluent in English and Russian. He is married and has one daughter.

References

External links

|-
 

1971 births
Living people
People from Loksa
Estonian brigadier generals
Soviet Army officers
Recipients of the Military Order of the Cross of the Eagle, Class IV